Jupiter-Avia was an airline based at Erebuni Airport in Armenia.

History
Jupiter-Avia was formed in 1998 and operated two Antonov An-24, it ceased to operate in 2002.

Fleet
2 x Antonov AN-24

References

Defunct airlines of Armenia
Airlines established in 1998
Airlines disestablished in 2002
Armenian companies established in 1998